Sallie Chapman Gordon Law (nicknamed Mother of the Confederacy; 1805–1894) was the first recorded Confederate nurse in the American Civil War.

Biography
Law was the president of the (Society of) Southern Mothers' Association, a group of women from the Second Presbyterian Church in Memphis, Tennessee.

The Southern Mothers started making uniforms for Tennessee soldiers before the state had even seceded from the Union. This was initially done in Mrs. Miles Owen's house at Madison and Third Street in Memphis. As the number of Women working increased, they moved to the basement of the Second Presbyterian Church. This may have been because their Pastor Dr. Grundy would not pray for or support the men of the Hickory Rifles and the Church was soon closed by the "Presbytery".

To meet the needs of the "sick confederate boys" in April 1861, the Memphis ladies first organized in Mrs Leroy Pope's house and set up twelve beds in Mrs. W. B. Greenlaw's house. Soon they moved again to Court Square on Irving, "at one time we had three hundred measles patients." (Page 5 of Her book) "Our Southern Mothers' Hospital in the Irving block was then moved to the Overton Hospital..."

The Southern Mothers' worked at Overton Hospital, tending to Confederate and Union patients. She also went to La Grange, Georgia, where she worked at Law Hospital, which was named after her.

The contributions of clothes and supplies became more than their Hospital could use, Sallie Law starting taking supplies to other locations. After the Federals took Memphis, Sallie Law left Memphis to move supplies where ever she found need.

On a trip to Columbus, Georgia, Sallie Law heard of the terrible conditions for soldiers in Gen. J. E. Johnson's division in Dalton, GA. Sallie Law went to the Ladies' Aid Society of Columbus to get Johnson's division the needed aid. After a second needed shipment for General Johnson's troops, the general arranged dinner celebrations and "a parade of thirty thousand brave, tattered troops" in honor her mission to Dalton, Georgia.

After the war she strove to comfort the vanquished and encourage the down-hearted, and continued in her way to do much good work.

Personal

She was born Sarah Chapman Gordon on August 27, 1805 in Wilkes, North Carolina to Chapman Gordon who fought at the Battle of Kings Mountain and Charity King. She married Rev. John Sandiford Law Jan. 25, 1825 in Putnam, Georgia. They had seven girls and one boy John Gordon Law, Confederate soldier. Sallie Law died June 28, 1894 in Memphis, Tennessee.

Letters 
From Memphis Daily Appeal July

April 23, 1861 Page 23, 24

July 1, 1861
To the Executive Committee of the Southern Mothers:
I herewith tender to you my resignation as surgeon of the institution under your charge.
Highly appreciating the honor you have conferred upon me, and the uniform
kindness you have always shown me, I am, respectfully,
Yours etc.,
G. W. Curry, M. D.

"Mothers' Rooms," July 2, 1861
G. W. Curry, M. D., Surgeon of the Society of "Southern Mothers:"
Dear Sir: The resignation of your position in our society having been laid
before a called meeting of the association, seventeen members being present, it was by acclamation voted that we cannot dispense with your services in our
"Rooms;" we therefore decline to accept the resignation, and beg you to enter
immediately upon your duties again, assuring you of our perfect confidence in
your skill, our high regard for you personally, and our heartfelt gratitude for the noble and disinterested service you have rendered as in our attempts to alleviate the horrors of war by nursing to the best of our ability the suffering sons of the South in arms for the defense of our homes.  

S. C. Law, President.   [<<< ]
Mary E. Pope, Secretary.
Memphis Daily Appeal, July 3, 1861.

From Memphis Daily Appeal July

Aug 9, 1861

August 9, 1861 - Relocation of the Southern Mothers hospital
Removal of the Mother's Hospital.-By the generous kindness of Mr. Norton,
the proprietor of the Irving block, Court square, the hospital of the Southern
Mother's institution has been removed to the north building of the block, freely placed at their service by Mr. Norton. The rooms are numerous and large,
admitting of free ventilation, and adapted for comfort. A hundred beds will be
provided, and in case it is needed the whole of the upper story can be occupied,
greatly increasing the amount of accommodations. As patients become convalescent,
or in cases where such a step is deemed desirable, they will be taken
into the private houses of the members and attended by their host's family physician.
In the basement every accommodation required is provided for cooking.
On the third story four fine rooms, quiet and retired will be reserved for cases
requiring extra attention. The number of patients last night was eleven in the

hospital and five at the residences of members. The association is performing
its great and good work without expense to the State or to the Government. The
assiduous attentions and skill of Dr. Curry have received deserved encomium
from the military board.

Memphis Daily Appeal, August 9, 1861.

See also
General Joseph E. Johnston
First Battle of Dalton
Army of Tennessee

References

External links
The Voice - Heroism In A Lost Cause - George M. Apperson
Second Presbyterian Church Memphis Civil War
REMINISCENCES of the WAR OF THE SIXITIES between the North and South - Mrs. S. C. Law

1805 births
1894 deaths
People of Tennessee in the American Civil War
American Civil War nurses
American women nurses